The Turing Baronetcy, of Foveran in the County of Aberdeen, is a title in the Baronetage of Nova Scotia. It was created in 1638 for John Turing, who was granted the barony of Foveran in Aberdeenshire by the king. He was a supporter of Charles I and was taken prisoner by the Covenanters in 1639. In 1651, he fought at the Battle of Worcester. The Turing family descends from Sir William Turing, a supporter of David II  (1329–1371).

The cryptographer and computing pioneer Alan Turing was the uncle of the twelfth Baronet.

Turing baronets, of Foveran (1638)
The following have been Turing baronets:

Sir John Turing, 1st Baronet (died 1662), created Baronet by the king
Sir John Turing, 2nd Baronet (died 1682), grandson of his predecessor
Sir John Turing, 3rd Baronet (1680–1733), grandnephew of the 1st Baronet
Sir Alexander Turing, 4th Baronet (1702–1782), son of his predecessor
Sir Inglis Turing, 5th Baronet (1743–1791), son of his predecessor
Sir Robert Turing, 6th Baronet (1745–1831), brother of his predecessor
Sir James Henry Turing, 7th Baronet (1791–1860), great-grandnephew of the 3rd Baronet
Sir Robert Fraser Turing, 8th Baronet (1827–1913), son of his predecessor
Sir James Walter Turing, 9th Baronet (1862–1928), son of his predecessor
Sir Robert Andrew Henry Turing, 10th Baronet (1895–1970), son of his predecessor
Sir John Leslie Turing, 11th Baronet (1895–1987), (younger twin) brother of his predecessor
Sir John Dermot Turing, 12th Baronet (born 1961), great-great-grandnephew of the 7th Baronet
 Heir Apparent: John Malcolm Ferrier Turing (born 1988), son
 Second in line: James Robert Edward Turing (born 1991), son

Family tree
The Turing baronets are related as follows:

References

1638 establishments in Nova Scotia
Turing
Alan Turing